Ambrose O'Madden (died 1715) was an Irish prelate of the Roman Catholic Church. He served as the Bishop of Clonfert from 1713 to 1715.

He was the parish priest of Loughrea when he was nominated Bishop of Killala and Apostolic Administrator of Kilmacduagh by the Sacred Congregation for the Propagation of the Faith on 30 August 1695. However, the nomination to Killala did not take effect, but he probably acted as administrator of Kilmacduagh. He was made Bishop of Kilmacduagh by Pope Clement XI on 15 November 1703, but the papal brief was delayed until 15 March 1707. Although appointed as Bishop of Kilmacduagh, he remained unconsecrated.

On 10 May 1707, Archbishop James Lynch of Tuam wrote to Pope Clement XI saying it would be more convenient for O'Madden to be translated from Kilmacduagh to Clonfert, since O'Madden's parish of Loughrea was in the Diocese of Clonfert. However, it was not judged best at that time, and O'Madden was allowed to retain his parish of Loughrea, along with the see of Kilmacduagh.

Six years later, O'Madden was elected Bishop of Clonfert by the Propagation of the Faith on 6 August, and was approved by Pope Clement XI on 22 August 1713. His papal brief was dated 15 September 1713. He was consecrated on 15 April 1714 by Thaddeus O'Rourke, Bishop of Killala.

Bishop O'Madden died in office in July 1715.

References

Bibliography

 
 

 

1715 deaths
Roman Catholic bishops of Clonfert
Roman Catholic bishops of Killala
Roman Catholic bishops of Kilmacduagh
17th-century Roman Catholic bishops in Ireland
18th-century Roman Catholic bishops in Ireland
People from County Galway
17th-century births